Petar Jokanovic (born 18 August 1990) is a Bosnian handball goalkeeper who plays for Luxembourgn club Red Boys Differdange and the Bosnian national team. He started playing handball for local club RK Kotor Varoš in Kotor Varoš, and later played for RK Borac Banja Luka and RK Bosna Sarajevo. He signed for HC Odorheiu Secuiesc in July 2015. After two years in Romania he signed with Red Boys Differdange.

Honours

Club
Handball Championship of Bosnia and Herzegovina:
Winner: 2014–15,
Handball Cup of Bosnia and Herzegovina:
Winner: 2014–15,

References

1990 births
Living people
Bosnia and Herzegovina male handball players
Sportspeople from Banja Luka

Serbs of Bosnia and Herzegovina